Kupea is a genus of myco-heterotrophic plants in family Triuridaceae, native to tropical Africa. It contains the following species:

 Kupea jonii Cheek  - Ulanga District of Tanzania
 Kupea martinetugei Cheek & S.A.Williams - Cameroon

References

Pandanales genera
Flora of Africa
Parasitic plants
Triuridaceae
Taxonomy articles created by Polbot
Taxa named by Martin Cheek